The following is a list of mosques found within the territory of modern Armenia.

History 

According to the 1870 publication of the Caucasian Calendar, a statistical report published by the Russian Viceroyalty of the Caucasus, there were a total of 269 Shia mosques in Erivan Governorate, a territory which today which comprises most of central Armenia, the Iğdır Province of Turkey, and the Nakhichevan exclave of Azerbaijan.

In Yerevan 
According to Brockhaus and Efron Encyclopedic Dictionary, by the turn of the twentieth century, the population of Erivan (modern Yerevan), center of the Erivan Governorate, was over 29,000; of this number 49% were "Aderbeydzhani Tatars" (modern Azerbaijanis), 48% were Armenians and 2% were Russians, and there were seven Shia mosques in Erivan. According to the traveler H. F. B. Lynch, the city of Erivan was about 50% Armenian and 50% Muslim in the early 1890s. H. F. B. Lynch thought that some among the Muslims were Persians when he visited the city within the same decade. According to modern historians George Bournoutian and Robert H. Hewsen, however, Lynch thought many were Persian.
After the capture of Yerevan by Russians as a result of the Russo-Persian War, the main mosque in the city fortress, built by Turks in 1582, was converted to an Orthodox church under the orders of the Russian commander, General Ivan Paskevich. The church was sanctified on December 6, 1827, and named the Church of the Intercession of the Holy Mother of God.

According to Ivan Chopin, there were eight mosques in Yerevan in the middle of the nineteenth century:

 Abbas Mirza Mosque (in the fortress) 
 Mohammad Khan Mosque (in the fortress)
 Zali Khan Mosque
 Shah Abbas Mosque
 Novruz Ali Beg Mosque
 Sartip Khan Mosque
 Blue Mosque 
 Hajji Imam Vardi Mosque
 Hajji Jafar Beg Mosque (Hajji Nasrollah Beg)
After 1917, many of the city's religious buildings were demolished in accordance with the Soviet government's modernization and anti-religious policies. The campaign saw the demolishment of churches, mosques, and the only synagogue in the city. According to the journalists Robert Cullen and Thomas de Waal, a few residents of Vardanants Street recall a small mosque being demolished in 1990. In 1988–1994 the overwhelming majority of the Muslim population, consisting of Azeris and Muslim Kurds, fled the country as a result of the First Nagorno-Karabakh War and the ongoing conflict between Armenia and Azerbaijan.

Existing mosques

Aragatsotn Province 

 Agarak Mosque

Lori Province 

 Arjut Mosque – ruined mosque in the village of Arjut
 Building in Lori Berd - The original purpose of the building is unknown, but it was later turned into a mosque during the 14th-15th century, and then into a church in the 18th century

Shirak Province 

 Zorakert Mosque

Syunik Province 

 Achanan Building - an old building from 695 AD in the village of Achanan with inscriptions from the Koran, signifying use as a holy place 
 Aghitu Mosque
 Andokavan Mosque

Yerevan 

 Abbas Mirza Mosque⁣ – only the frame of the building is preserved
 Blue Mosque⁣ – the only active mosque in Armenia today 
 Mosques in the Kond quarter of Yerevan - the central square contains a   "cluster of non-operating mosques dating back to the 17th and 18th centuries":
 Abbasqoli Khan Mosque (also known as the Tepebashi, Thapha Bashi,or Kond Mosque) – a large, derelict 17th century mosque in the Kond quarter of Yerevan, the mosque was used to house 17 refugee families after the Armenian genocide. Today, 4 families use the mosque as makeshift housing. The dome of the mosque collapsed after the 1988 Armenian earthquake and is in a crumbling state today. In 2022, plans were announced in cooperation between Iranian authorities and the Yerevan municipality to renovate the mosque.
 Small mosque of Kond - a small mosque in ruins in the Kond quarter of Yerevan.

See also 
 Islam in Armenia

References 

 
Mosques
Armenia